The Waikato rugby league team (also known as the Waikato Cougars, formerly as South Auckland) is a New Zealand rugby league team that represents the Waikato Rugby League in New Zealand Rugby League competitions. They competed in the Lion Red Cup from 1994 to 1996, the Super League Challenge Cup in 1997 and the Bartercard Premiership in 2008 and 2009.

History

Lion Red Cup
Between 1994 and 1996, the Waikato region was represented by the Waikato Cougars in the Lion Red Cup competition. The team's inaugural captain was Tukere Barlow while Joe Gwynne was the coach. The team was originally going to be called the Stags or the Chiefs before the Cougars nickname was selected.

Notable players included; Martin Moana, Gavin Hill, Tama Hohaia, Francis Leota, Darryl Beazley, 1994 captain Tukere Barlow, Butch Tua, 1995 captain Aaron Tucker, Tony Waikato, Kiwi Mark Woods and Hekewaru Muru.

Late 1990s
The Waikato Cougars won the Super League Challenge Cup in 1997, defeating Canterbury in the final. During this year they also defeated Auckland at Carlaw Park for the first time since 1943 and won the Rugby League Cup. They defended the Rugby League Cup in 1998.

Bartercard Cup

The Waikato region was represented in the Bartercard Cup competition by the Waicoa Bay Stallions, a co-operative team involving players from Waikato, Coastline and Bay of Plenty federations.

Bartercard Premiership
Waikato Rugby League were one of the six teams that compete in the National Provincial Competition in 2008 and 2009. In both years they finished third.

References

New Zealand rugby league teams
Rugby league in the Waikato